Béhagnies is a commune in the Pas-de-Calais department in the Hauts-de-France region in northern France.

Geography
A small farming village located 13 miles (21 km) south of Arras on the N17 road, at the junction with the D31.

Population

Sights
 The church of St. Martin, dating from the twentieth century

See also
Communes of the Pas-de-Calais department

References

Communes of Pas-de-Calais